is a 2002 Japanese anime film, written and directed by Takashi Nakamura. It was an official selection of the 2002 Berlin Film Festival.

Story

A Tree of Palme can be seen as a distant allusion of the 1883 novel The Adventures of Pinocchio by Carlo Collodi. It concerns a small puppet, Palme, who was tasked by his creator to look over his ailing wife, Xian. After her death, Palme is visited by a mysterious woman whom he mistakenly believes to be Xian. Shaken out of his sadness, Palme accepts her request to deliver something special to a far-off place known as Tama. This sets Palme off on a journey to discover his own emotions, and what it truly means to be human.

Voice cast

References

External links
 
 

2002 fantasy films
2002 anime films
ADV Films
Japanese animated fantasy films
Pinocchio films
Animated films based on children's books
Anime films based on novels